Suriname is divided into 10 districts.

Overview

History
The country was first divided up into subdivisions by the Dutch on October 8, 1834, when a Royal Decree declared that there were to be 8 divisions and 2 districts:
Upper Suriname and Torarica
Para
Upper Commewijne
Upper Cottica and Perica
Lower Commewijne
Lower Cottica
Matapica
Saramacca
Coronie (district)
Nickerie (district)

The divisions were areas near the capital city, Paramaribo, and the districts were areas further away from the city.

In 1927, Suriname's districts were revised, and the country was divided into 7 districts. In 1943, 1948, 1949, 1952 and 1959 further small modifications were made. On October 28, 1966, the districts were redrawn again, into
Nickerie
Coronie
Saramacca
Brokopondo
Para
Suriname
Paramaribo
Commewijne
Marowijne

These divisions remained until 1980, when yet again, the borders of the districts were redrawn, however, with the following requirements: 
Changes in the old boundaries were made only if it leads to improved functioning
Each area should be developed
The new boundaries should respect the identities of indigenous people.

The last changes to the districts were in 1985.

See also
 ISO 3166-2:SR
 Resorts of Suriname
 List of Caribbean First-level Subdivisions by Total Area

References

External links
 

 
Subdivisions of Suriname
Suriname, Districts
Districts, Suriname
Suriname geography-related lists